Alligerville Historic District is a national historic district located at Alligerville, Ulster County, New York. It encompasses 81 contributing buildings, 5 contributing sites, and 8 contributing structures in the hamlet of Alligerville.  It developed after 1828 around Lock 21 (originally Lock 22) on the Delaware and Hudson Canal and includes notable examples of Greek Revival, Gothic Revival, and Italian Villa architecture. Notable contributing resources include the John & Catrina Alliger House (c. 1828), Reformed Dutch Church of the Clove Chapel (c. 1858), Ira Brodhead House (c. 1851), John Forbes Hotel (c. 1868), Alligerville Post Office (c. 1920), Thomas S. Schoonmaker Farm (1830), Union Free District No. 1 School (1878, 1966), Canal Outbuilding (c. 1850), Hall-Latinville Summer Cottages (c. 1935), and Hall-Barrett Summer Cottage (c. 1935).

It was listed on the National Register of Historic Places in 2015.

References

Historic districts on the National Register of Historic Places in New York (state)
Greek Revival architecture in New York (state)
Gothic Revival architecture in New York (state)
Italianate architecture in New York (state)
Historic districts in Ulster County, New York
Rondout Creek
National Register of Historic Places in Ulster County, New York